A comforter is a type of blanket. It may also refer to:

 "Comforter" (song), a 1993 song by Shai
 Holy Comforter, believed to be the Holy Spirit in Christianity
 pacifier, also known as a comforter, a rubber, plastic, or silicone nipple
 Paraclete, a descriptive term used in the Gospel of John which may be translated in English as "counselor", "helper", or "comforter"
 cap comforter, a military headdress

See also
 Comfort (disambiguation)